Taner Ceylan (born 1967) is a German-born Turkish photo-realist artist. He lives and works in Istanbul.

Biography 
Taner Ceylan studied painting in the Fine Arts Faculty at Mimar Sinan University between 1986 - 1991. He then worked for the Fine Arts Faculty of Yeditepe University between 2001 and 2003 as a lecturer and worked as an editor in chief of arts of Time Out Istanbul Magazine between 2001 and 2006. Many of his painting are in private collections such as those of Martin Browne, Dan Cameron, Fethi Pekin, and museum collections such as the Dr. F. Nejat Eczacıbasi Foundation and the Scheringa Museum of Realist Art.

His highest priced work is the painting 1879 (From the Lost Paintings Series) (2011) in which a veiled Ottoman noblewoman stands before the framed canvas of L'Origine du monde. He is represented by Paul Kasmin Gallery in New York City.

Exhibitions

Solo 
 2013 The Lost Paintings Series, Paul Kasmin Gallery, New York
 2011 The Lost Paintings Series, Galerist, Istanbul, Turkey
 2010 Galerist, Istanbul, Turkey
 2009 Abstraction of Nothing, I-20 Gallery, New York
 2005 De-Composed, Galerist, Istanbul, Turkey
 2002 1997 / 2002, Galerist, Istanbul, Turkey
 1997 More, Derimod Art Gallery, Istanbul, Turkey
 1996 Steven Maurice, Meannertreu, Nürnberg, Germany
 1995 The Monte Carlo Style, Devlet Han, Istanbul, Turkey
 1994 Young Osman, Armenian Catholic Monastery, Istanbul, Turkey
 1992 Private Party, Derimod Art Gallery, Istanbul, Turkey
 1991 Scandal, Galerie Fliederlich, Nürnberg, Germany and Mannsbild, Galerie Hemdendienst, Nürnberg, Germany

Group 
 2011 Double Crescents, Chelsea24 Gallery, New York, USA and Confessions of Dangerous Minds Contemporary Art from Turkey, Phillips De Pury & Company Rooms, Saatchi Gallery, London, UK
 2010 İstanbul Next Wave, Martin Gropius Bau, Berlin, Germany and New Works, New Horizons, Istanbul Modern, Istanbul, Turkey
 2009 Naked!, curated by Adrian Dannatt, Paul Kasmin Gallery, New York.
 2006 Works on Paper, Galerist, Istanbul, Turkey
 2005 Free-Kick, 9th Istanbul Biennial, Istanbul, Turkey and Liaisons, Stephane Ackermann, Agence D'Art Contemporain, Luxembourg
 2004 Poetic Justice, curated by Dan Cameron, 8th Istanbul Biennial, Turkey
 2003 Families Only / Aileye Mahsus, Karsi Sanat Calismalari, Istanbul, Turkey and Contemporary Art Fair, Istanbul
 2002 Dangerous Things, curated by Levent Calikoglu, Karsi Sanat, Istanbul, Turkey
 1997 Performance Days, Darphane, Istanbul, Turkey
 1995 Young Artists Exhibition, Istanbul, Turkey and Youth Events / Genc Etkinlik, TUYAP, Istanbul, Turkey
 1993 Recollection Memory2 / Ani Bellek2, curated by Vasif Kortun, Akaretler, Istanbul, Turkey
 1991 Kassel Exhibition, Kassel, Germany and Mixed Eight / Sekizli Karma, Mimar Sinan University, Istanbul, Turkey
 1990 Mixed Contemporary, Cemal Resit Rey, Istanbul, Turkey

Seminars and conferences 
 2010 Istancool, LTHM, Istanbul, Turkey
 2006 Hinterland Lambda, Istanbul, Turkey
 2006 Artistic Reflections of Personal Experiences Kaos GL Ankara, Turkey
 2004 The Meta Modern Era in Art History, Bogazici University, Istanbul, Turkey
 1990 Kassel's Documenta, M.S.U.Oditorium, Istanbul, Turkey
 1990 Joseph Beuys, M.S.U.Oditorium, Istanbul, Turkey
 1991 Anselm Kiefer, M.S.U.Oditorium, Istanbul, Turkey
 1999 Homosexual Aesthetic in the Art History, NON Studio, Istanbul, Turkey

References

Sources
Quist, Taylor, "The Emotional Reality of Taner Ceylan," Whitewall, 10/01/13.
Unsal, Merve, "The Brutally Realistic Fictions of Taner Ceylan's 'Lost Paintings'," ArtInfo, 09/26/13.
"Taner Ceylan solo exhibition opens in New York," Hurriyet Daily News, 09/20/13.
"Taner Ceylan, 'The Lost Paintings Series'," Time Out, 09/03/13.
Lescaze, Zoe, "Painter Taner Ceylan talks Turkish Protests, 'Lost Paintings'," Gallerist NY, 07/24/13.
 http://www.anibellek.org/?p=357
 http://www.hurriyet.com.tr/cumartesi/17248201_p.asp

External links 
 http://www.tanerceylan.com/

Mimar Sinan Fine Arts University alumni
Living people
1967 births
Turkish contemporary artists